Juan José de los Ángeles Segui (born 21 February 1973 in Xeraco) is a former Spanish cyclist. He rode in 8 Grand Tours.

Major results
2000
 9th Circuito de Getxo
2001
 1st GP Llodio
2002
 8th Overall Vuelta Ciclista a la Rioja

Grand Tour general classification results timeline

References

1973 births
Living people
Spanish male cyclists
Cyclists from the Valencian Community
People from Safor
Sportspeople from the Province of Valencia